While We Are Young is a 20 episode Singaporean drama produced and telecast on MediaCorp Channel 8. The show aired at 9 pm on weekdays and had a repeat telecast at 8 am the following day.

The drama series is a production to commemorate 35 years of locally produced Chinese-language dramas and in appreciation to the local educators in celebration of Teacher's Day. It stars Zoe Tay, Rebecca Lim, Zhang Zhenhuan, Terence Cao, Denise Camillia, Zong Zijie and Chantalle Ng.

The show featured several "second-generation" stars who are children of veteran artistes, including Calvert Tay (son of Hong Huifang and Zheng Geping), Chantalle Ng (daughter of Lin Meijiao and her ex-husband former actor Huang Yiliang), Chen Yixin (daughter of Xiang Yun and Edmund Chen), Marcus Guo (son of host Guo Liang), and Shalynn Tsai (daughter of Chen Xiuhuan).

Cast

Generation X/Y 

 Zoe Tay as Fang Ting 方廷For the first time in 29 years, Tay played the role of a teacher which incidentally has been her childhood dream. She had previously taken on a variety of roles, but never those of a teacher.
 Alicia Lo as young Fang Ting
 Rebecca Lim as Zhong Ai 钟爱
 Zhang Zhenhuan as Tang Yiwei 汤一伟
 Terence Cao as Bai Jinshun 白金顺
 Chen Yixi as young Bai Junshun
 Denise Camillia Tan as Zheng Jiayi 郑嘉怡

Generation Z 

 Calvert Tay 郑凯介 as Tang Yijie 汤一杰, Fang Ting's son

Zhou Yue Junior College Staff(s)

Other Casts

Original Sound Track (OST)

Awards and nominations

Production 
Filming began in May and wrapped in July 2017, with the major scene taken at Nanyang Junior College. The series is the first to cover Singapore's post-secondary education landscape.

See also 
List of MediaCorp Channel 8 Chinese drama series (2010s)

References

2017 Singaporean television series debuts
Channel 8 (Singapore) original programming